Derek Synnott (born 17 October 1977) is an Irish actor. He played Froderick in Princess of Thieves and DC Alan Carter in Murphy's Law.

Synnott was born and raised in Dublin, Ireland. When he was 11 years old, he and his family moved to Essex, England in 1989. He attended The Hedley Walter School, in Brentwood, Essex, from 1989.

He has also appeared in the TV version of Lock Stock and Two Smoking Barrels titled "Lock Stock" and the Samuelson Productions feature Stormbreaker. In 2013, he appeared in The Great Train Robbery as Brian Field.
His very first TV role was in the mini series "Every woman knows a secret" in 1999. Since then he has had major roles in programs such as Dangerfield, Waking The Dead, Red Cap , Doc Martin and New Tricks.

Personal life
Synnott met actress Keira Knightley on the set of the 2001 TV movie Princess of Thieves.  The two later appeared together in the short film Deflation by Roger Ashton-Griffiths and as extras in the larger film Thunderpants.  In 2003 Synnott and Knightley broke up after two years together.

References

External links

1977 births
British male film actors
British male television actors
Living people